Questa casa non è un albergo  is an Italian television series. It is also known as "Amo Costanza ma senza speranza.

Cast

Sabina Ciuffini: Anna Donati
Sergio Bini Bustric: Francesco Donati
Nicole Grimaudo: Costanza Donati
Irene Ferri: Valentina Donati
Anna Iuzzolini: Lorenza Donati
Alessandro Zamattio: Nino Donati
Novello Novelli: Nonno
Cristina Ascani: Zia Titti 
Sascha Zacharias: Lotte

See also
List of Italian television series

External links
 

Italian television series
2000 Italian television series debuts
2000s Italian television series
Rete 4 original programming